The MTV Europe Music Award for Best Song is the main award of the MTV Europe Music Awards. It was first awarded in 1994, when "7 Seconds" won it, and has been given out every year since. The category was renamed Most Addictive Track for the 2007 and 2008 shows. Beyoncé, Lady Gaga and Pink have won the award twice.

Winners and nominees
Winners are listed first and highlighted in bold

1990s

2000s

2010s

2020s

Nominated With MTV Europe Music Award for Best Video

Statistic
As of 2018.

References

MTV Europe Music Awards
Awards established in 1994
Song awards